The Southern Premier Soccer League (SPSL) was an amateur soccer league featuring teams from Texas and Oklahoma and recognized by the United States Soccer Federation and United States Adult Soccer Association. The league existed from September 2010 to June 2011, and ran two seasons during this brief but unsteady existencea six-team 2010-2011 winter season that saw two teams depart or fold mid-season, and a six-team 2011 spring season that saw one team fold mid-season.

Origin
The National Premier Soccer League (NPSL) had intended to introduce a NPSL Winter League, with initial operation in the 2010–2011 winter season. However the FC Tulsa folded at the end of the normal NPSL 2010 season, leaving the NPSL's South Central division with three teams, less than the minimum four required for a division.

The remaining NPSL South Central teamsGalveston Pirate SC, Houston-based Regals FC, Corpus Christi Fuelfounded the SPSL in September 2010, reaching out to a number of potential new teams to join the newly formed league. By month's end, the SPSL finalized a slate of six teams to start the season; the original survivors of the NPSL South Central division, plus Club América Soccer Academy Houston, Texas Lonestrikers from Nacogdoches, Texas, and a new Tulsa-based team,  Tulsa Lobos FC.

SPSL 2010–2011 winter season
The inaugural 2010–11 SPSL season ran from October 2 through March 26. Each team was to play 20 games during the regular season. Before the season ended, Texas Lonestrikers folded and Galveston Pirate SC, having reached a new agreement with the NPSL, withdrew from play. Regals FC won the inaugural season, with five of the six top goal scorers in the SPSL playing for that club.

SPSL 2011 spring season
Having ended its first season with just four teams, the SPSL continued to recruit new clubs for the 2011 spring season. Two additional teams were added in time for the season: the Rio Grande Valley Ocelots FC (continuing on from their summer 2010 season in the USL Premier Development League) and the Houston Hurricane (revival of a name last used in 1980 by a team playing in the North American Soccer League). Club América folded before the season finished. The Ocelots won the short 2011 Spring season, with a 9–1 record and a championship game victory over Regals FC.

SPSL folds
The SPSL folded after completing a shortened 2011 Spring season.

Teams

References

Defunct soccer leagues in the United States
Soccer in Texas
Soccer in Oklahoma
Sports leagues established in 2010
Sports leagues disestablished in 2011
2010 establishments in Texas
2011 disestablishments in Texas
2010 establishments in Oklahoma
2011 disestablishments in Oklahoma